Creature with the Blue Hand is a West German horror film directed by Alfred Vohrer and starring Harald Leipnitz, Klaus Kinski and Ilse Steppat. It is based on the 1925 novel The Blue Hand by Edgar Wallace and was part of a long-running series of adaptations made by Rialto Film. The film's plot involves the police tracking a killer known as the Blue Hand. It was shot at the Spandau Studios in Berlin. The film's sets were designed by the art director Walter Kutz and Wilhelm Vorwerg.

Cast
 Harald Leipnitz as Inspector Craig
 Klaus Kinski as Dave Emerson / Richard Emerson
 Carl Lange as Dr. Albert Mangrove
 Ilse Steppat as Lady Emerson
 Hermann Lenschau as Lawyer Douglas
 Diana Körner as Myrna Emerson
 Gudrun Genest as Nurse Harris
 Albert Bessler as Butler Anthony
 Richard Haller as Edward Appleton / The Blue Hand
 Ilse Pagé as Miss Mabel Finley
 Fred Haltiner as Warder Reynolds
 Peter Parten as Robert Emerson
 Thomas Danneberg as Charles Emerson
 Heinz Spitzner as Judge
 Siegfried Schürenberg as Sir John

Release
Creature with the Blue Hand was released in 1967. The film was bought by New World Pictures and issued as a double feature in the United States with Beast of the Yellow Night. The film was later re-edited in 1987 with new gore inserts by producer Sam Sherman and released to home video as The Bloody Dead.

References

Bibliography 
 Bergfelder, Tim. International Adventures: German Popular Cinema and European Co-Productions in the 1960s. Berghahn Books, 2005.

External links

1967 films
1967 crime films
German crime films
West German films
1960s German-language films
Films directed by Alfred Vohrer
New World Pictures films
Films produced by Horst Wendlandt
Films based on British novels
Films based on works by Edgar Wallace
Films about twin brothers
Constantin Film films
Films shot at Spandau Studios
1960s German films